Bluesiana II is an album by Bluesiana Triangle, led by pianist/vocalist Dr. John and saxophonist David "Fathead" Newman, that recorded in 1991 and released on the Windham Hill label.

Reception

In his review for AllMusic, William Ruhlmann states "in the spring of 1991, Dr. John and Newman organized this second Bluesiana session ... The resulting music again justifies the name, blues played in a funky Louisiana style with plenty of room for extended jazzy soloing. Though much of the material was written by Dr. John and he does sing occasionally, this is not a conventional Dr. John vocal album. It does contain some excellent playing, however."

Track listing 
All compositions by Mac Rebennack except where noted
 "Fonkalishus" (Ray Anderson, David "Fathead" Newman, Mac Rebennack) – 5:55
 "Doctor Blooze" – 3:33	
 "Cowan Woman" – 6:47
 "For Art's Sake" (Anderson, Rebennack) – 8:10
 "Skoshuss" – 5:16
 "Love's Parody" (Will Calhoun) – 3:26
 "Santa Rosalia" – 5:29
 "San Antone" (Traditional) – 4:28
 "Montana Banana" (David "Fathead" Newman) – 5:33
 "Tribute to Art" (Calhoun) – 6:53

Personnel 
Dr. John – piano, guitar, vocals
David Newman – tenor saxophone, alto saxophone, flute
Ray Anderson – trombone 
Will Calhoun – drums
Essiet Okon Essiet (tracks 6–9), Jay Leonhart (tracks 1–5) – bass
Joe Bonadio – percussion

References 

Dr. John albums
David "Fathead" Newman albums
1991 albums
Windham Hill Records albums